James "Jim" Buckley Paterson (19 April 1898 – fourth ¼ 1969), also known by the nickname of 'JB', was an English professional rugby league footballer who played in the 1920s.

Background
Jim Paterson's birth was registered in Wakefield district, West Riding of Yorkshire, England, and his death aged 71 was registered in Wakefield district, West Riding of Yorkshire, England.

Playing career

Notable tour matches
Jim Paterson played   in Wakefield Trinity's 3-29 defeat by Australia in the 1921–22 Kangaroo tour of Great Britain match at Belle Vue, Wakefield on Saturday 22 October 1921.

Genealogical information
Jim Paterson's marriage to Mary L. (née Dews) was registered during third ¼ 1932 in Wakefield district.

References

External links
Search for "Paterson" at rugbyleagueproject.org
Search for "Patterson" at rugbyleagueproject.org

1898 births
1969 deaths
English rugby league players
Rugby league five-eighths
Rugby league players from Wakefield
Wakefield Trinity players